Diachasma alloeum is a small wasp in the family Braconidae.  It is a parasitoid of Rhagoletis pomonella, the apple maggot.  The wasp lays its eggs into third-instar larvae of the fly, which then develop after the larvae have pupated.  The immature wasps then eat the fly larvae and overwinter inside the fly puparia.

D. alloeum wasps attacking R. pomonella in apples appear to be undergoing a speciation event in concert with their hosts. This is an example of sequential sympatric speciation.

References

Braconidae
Hymenoptera of North America
Insects described in 1956